Xavier Chevrier (born 17 March 1990) is an Italian male mountain runner and long-distance runner who won 2017 European Mountain Running Championships.

Biography
Originally from Nus, he also won three national championships at individual senior level in mountain running. He is the cousin of the cross-country skiing champion Federico Pellegrino. He runs a farm with his wife Denise, they have one child, Loïc, born in 2020.

Achievements

Team results
World Mountain Running Championships
 2015
 2012, 2013, 2016, 2017
 2014
European Mountain Running Championships
 2012, 2013, 2015, 2016
 2017

National titles
Italian Mountain Running Championships
2015, 2017
Italian Long Distance Mountain Running Championships
2016

References

External links
 

1990 births
Living people
Italian male mountain runners
Italian male long-distance runners
Trail runners
People from Aosta
21st-century Italian people